This is a survey of the postage stamps and postal history of the Gambia.

The Gambia is a country in West Africa surrounded by Senegal except for a short coastline on the Atlantic Ocean in the west. The Gambia River, from which the country takes its name, flows through it. The capital city is Banjul.

First stamps
The first stamps of Gambia were issued in March 1869. The early issues featured an embossed portrait of Queen Victoria.

Independence
The Gambia achieved independence on 18 February 1965, as a constitutional monarchy within the Commonwealth. On 24 April 1970, The Gambia became a republic.

Legendary Heroes of Africa
Legendary Heroes of Africa was a series of postage stamps simultaneously issued and released by the countries of Gambia, Liberia, and Sierra Leone in March 2011 to celebrate Jewish heroes of the South African Liberation struggle.

See also
West Africa Study Circle

References

Further reading 
Melville, F.J. Gambia. London: The Melville Stamp Books, 1909. Free download at Project Gutenberg here.

External links
Collecting The Gambia - West African Study Circle.

Communications in the Gambia
History of the Gambia
Philately of the Gambia